Cottbus-Sandow station is a railway station in the Sandow district in the town of Cottbus, located Brandenburg, Germany.

References

External links

Railway stations in Brandenburg
Buildings and structures in Cottbus